Ewa Fröling, (Eva Marie Fröling; born 9 August 1952) is a Swedish actress and director who was born in Stockholm. She is internationally most recognized for her leading parts in Gunnel Lindblom's Sally och friheten (as Sally) and Ingmar Bergman's Fanny and Alexander (as Emelie).

She studied at Sweden's Theatre Academy (Teaterhögskolan) in Malmö and from 1977-88 was an actress at Sweden's national stage Dramaten where Fröling appeared in plays such as Stiftelsen directed by Alf Sjöberg, as Johanna in Bertolt Brecht's Heliga Johanna från slakthusen (Saint Joan of the Stockyards) and in Ingmar Bergman's classic 1984 staging of Shakespeare's King Lear (as Regan). In the 1990s she worked mainly at Stockholms stadsteater (Stockholm City Theatre). Ewa Fröling was back on stage at Dramaten; in the title role as Vera in the success play by popular Swedish playwright Kristina Lugn, 2005.

Fröling has been married to actor Örjan Ramberg with whom she has a daughter,  Tilde. She participated in Let's Dance 2016 which was broadcast on TV4.

Selected filmography
1979 - Katitzi (TV-series)
1980 - Välkommen hem (TV-theatre)
1981 - Sally and Freedom
1981 - Peter-No-Tail (Pelle Svanslös) (voice only)
1982 - Fanny and Alexander
1983 - G
1983 - Två killar och en tjej
1987 - Träff i helfigur
1987 - Jim & Piraterna Blom
1988 - S.O.S. - En segelsällskapsresa
1991 - The Ox (film)
 1993 - Sista Dansen 
2000 - Gossip
2001 - Sprängaren
2003 - Paradiset
2004 - The Incredibles (Edna Mode in the Swedish version of film)
2005 - Robotar
2009 - The Girl with the Dragon Tattoo (Män som hatar kvinnor)

References

External links

1952 births
Living people
Swedish stage actresses
Swedish film actresses